The Society Farsharotu, officially the Aromanian Cultural Society Farsharotu, is an organization of Aromanians in the United States, with its headquarters at Trumbull, Connecticut. The Aromanians are a Balkan ethnic group scattered over many countries in the region. These are Albania, Bulgaria, Greece, North Macedonia, Romania and Serbia. The organization's former full name used to be "Romanian Cultural and Benevolent Society Farsarotul".

The Society Farsharotu was the first Aromanian association in the United States and it was founded in 1903 by Nicolae Cican and other Aromanian emigrants from Albania, the north of Greece and Serbia. The Aromanians are divided into several subgroups, one of them being the Farsherots, whose name comes from the village of Frashër in Albania. The Society Farsharotu publishes The Newsletter of the Society Farsharotu twice a year. It is available on the website of the association.

See also
 Aromanian diaspora
 Aromanian question

References

External links
 
 

Aromanian diaspora
Aromanian cultural organizations
1903 establishments in Connecticut
Organizations established in 1903
Organizations based in Connecticut